John III Palaeologus (c. 1362 – 25 August 1381) was the Margrave of Montferrat from 1378 to his death. He was the second son of John II of Montferrat and Isabella of Majorca and brother and successor of Secondotto. On 3 January 1379, John III was installed as margrave under the regency of his uncle Otto, Duke of Brunswick-Grubenhagen. 

Desirous of avenging his brother's death and recuperating the territory lost in the aftermath of Secondotto's retreat, John declared war on the Visconti of Milan, but was forced to sign a peace before fighting had begun, under the pressure of the Antipope Clement VII of Avignon, who wished to have Otto of Brunswick at his court. Otto consequently signed the treaty and confirmed the borders of the margraviate during his absence. In order to guarantee the survival of the margraviate, Otto placed it under the protection of the Kingdom of France. 

Later, John followed Otto to the court of the Kingdom of Naples, but during his absence troubles arose. When Charles III was declared King of Naples and Joan I successively fled, John and Otto found themselves fully immersed in the war over the Neapolitan succession and unable to return to Montferrat. On 25 August 1381, they were involved in a battle in which Otto was captured and the young John slain. He was succeeded by his younger brother Theodore II, Marquis of Montferrat.

Ancestry

Sources
Dizionario Biografico degli Italiani LV Ginammi – Giovanni da Crema. Caravale, Mario (ed). Rome, 2000.

1362 births
1381 deaths
14th-century Italian nobility
Palaiologos dynasty
Marquesses of Montferrat
Military personnel killed in action